is a retired Japanese professional baseball pitcher. He played in Nippon Professional Baseball for the Nippon Ham Fighters, Hiroshima Toyo Carp, Chunichi Dragons, and Chiba Lotte Marines.

External links

1965 births
Living people
Sportspeople from Kōchi Prefecture
Nippon Professional Baseball pitchers
Nippon Ham Fighters players
Hiroshima Toyo Carp players
Chunichi Dragons players
Chiba Lotte Marines players